Francisco António Lucas Pires (19 October 1944 – 22 May 1998) was a Portuguese teacher, lawyer, and politician.

Biography 
Pires was married to Maria Teresa Bahia de Almeida Garrett, and was the father of four children.

He graduated from law school at the University of Coimbra in 1966 and then began complementary course on political science and economics, which he completed in 1968. He completed his PhD in legal and political science in 1989 before starting an academic career as a professor at the Faculty of Law of Coimbra.

Politics 
Pires joined the CDS in 1974 and became a deputy to the Assembly of the Republic. He served as the Minister of Culture and Scientific Coordination in the VIII Constitutional Government. He was a member of the Council of State from 1983 to 1985.

Between February 1983 and October 1985 Pires led Partido Popular, having left the presidency due to the poor results in the parliamentary elections in October 1985. Pires was elected to the European Parliament in 1987. In the following elections to the European Parliament, Pires joined the ranks of the CDS. He was the first Portuguese Vice-President of the European Parliament from 1987 to 1988 (and again in 1998), and was the first vice president of the European Christian Democratic Foundation for Cooperation. Pires formally joined the PSD in 1997.

Selected works

Death 
Pires died of a heart attack on 22 May 1998 while traveling from Lisbon to Coimbra.

References 

20th-century Portuguese lawyers
Academic staff of the University of Coimbra